Eisaku (written: , ,  or ) is a masculine Japanese given name. Notable people with the name include:

, Japanese manga artist
, Japanese politician and Prime Minister of Japan
, Japanese politician
, Japanese shogi player
, Japanese painter
, Japanese actor and singer

Japanese masculine given names